Jeff M. Angelo (born December 5, 1964) is a radio talk show host for WHO (AM) in Des Moines, Iowa.  His show, "Need To Know With Jeff Angelo," airs from 9 am Central Time to 11 am Central Time.  The show discusses politics, pop culture, and life in Iowa.

Angelo was the Iowa State Senator from the 48th District. He served three terms in the Iowa Senate (1997–2009) and was an assistant minority leader.

Angelo served on several committees in the Iowa Senate: the Appropriations committee, the Commerce committee, the Local Government committee, the Rules and Administration committee, and the Ways and Means committee.

Angelo was re-elected in 2004 with 14,981 votes (54%), defeating Democratic opponent Steve Waterman.  On September 17, 2007, he announced that he would not seek re-election in 2008.

Family
Angelo is married to his wife Tara and together they have three adult children. They reside in downtown Des Moines, Iowa.

Religion
Angelo is a Christian.

Education
In 1984, Angelo received his broadcasting degree from Broadcast Center in St. Louis, MO. He graduated from Lutheran High School North in St. Louis in 1983, serving as Senior Class President.

Organizations
Angelo has served on the board of One Iowa. He has also been a member of the Rotary Club Of Des Moines. 
Chair of the Union County Republicans 
Member of the Union County University Extension Council

References

External links
Iowa General Assembly - Senator Jeff Angelo official government website
Project Vote Smart - Jeff Angelo profile
Follow the Money - Jeff Angelo
2006 2004  2000 1998 campaign contributions
Iowa Senate Republicans - Jeff Angelo profile

Republican Party Iowa state senators
1964 births
Living people
Politicians from St. Louis
People from Creston, Iowa